The Lowdown is a New Zealand website developed by the New Zealand Ministry of Health's National Depression Initiative (NDI). The website launched on 3 December 2007.

Mission 
The Lowdown aims to help young New Zealanders understand and recover from depression. It does this through online support services and testimonials from New Zealand celebrities.

Features

Navigators 
The user can choose from one of four celebrity navigators who tell users how to use the website.  There is also a "go alone" option.

Information and Help 
The website has depression-related fact sheets and contact lists, as well as online self-tests.

Stories 
The Lowdown has video of New Zealand celebrities and musicians talking about how they or someone they know made it through depression.  Users can also add their own stories by submitting video or text.

Chat 
Users can chat together in a style similar to a bulletin board.

Multimedia 
Users can listen to streaming songs from contributing musicians.

Interface 
The website uses flash built on ActionScript 3.  It uses the Sandy 3D engine.

List of celebrities contributing to The Lowdown

Musicians

TV and Radio

Other

References

External links 

 The Lowdown Website

Internet properties established in 2007
New Zealand health websites